Finch House may refer to:

James W. Finch House, Monterey, California, listed on the National Register of Historic Places (NRHP)
John A. Finch Caretaker's House, Hayden Lake, Idaho, listed on the NRHP in Kootenai County, Idaho
Fred Finch House, Davenport, Iowa, NRHP-listed
Burrus–Finch House, McKinney, Texas, listed on the NRHP in Collin County, Texas
Knight–Finch House, Orem, Utah, NRHP-listed
Finch House (Spokane, Washington), listed on the NRHP in Spokane County, Washington
John A. Finch Memorial Nurses Home, Spokane, Washington, also known as Finch Hall, NRHP-listed

See also
Finch Building (disambiguation)